Radilovo is a rural locality (a village) in Moshokskoye Rural Settlement, Sudogodsky District, Vladimir Oblast, Russia. The population was 15 as of 2010.

Geography 
Radilovo is located 54 km east of Sudogda (the district's administrative centre) by road. Mitino is the nearest rural locality.

References 

Rural localities in Sudogodsky District